Chairachathirat, or Chai reigned 1534–1546 as King of the Ayutthaya kingdom of Siam. His reign was remarkable for the influx of Portuguese traders, mercenaries, and early Modern warfare technology.

Birth 
The evidence regarding his father is not yet clear; the Royal Chronicle by the Venerable Vanarata of Pakaeo Temple and the Royal Chronicle (Rattanakosin edition) only state that King Chairachathirat is of the royal family of King Ramathibodi. The Pali text "Sangitiyavansa", authored in the reign of King Rama I by the Venerable Vanarata of Pho Temple, state that he is the nephew (son of the sister) of Ramathibodi.

Coup 
In 1533, following the death of King Borommaracha IV, Prince Ratsadathirat (Borommaracha IV's son) succeeded to the Ayutthayan throne. Governmental authority under five-year-old Ratsadathirat proved to be weak. In 1534, only five months after his nephew's ascension, Chairacha marched to Ayutthaya to stage a coup, killed his nephew, and took the throne of Ayutthaya.

King of Ayutthaya

Burmese invasion of Muang Chiang Kran
In 1539, King Tabinshwehti attacked the Mon people inhabiting Chiang Kran, which was under Siamese rule.  Chairachathirat "marched against Chiang Kran" with the aid of 120 Portuguese traders in Ayutthaya and drove the Burmese back.  The Portuguese were then allowed to build a church near the Takhian Canal to practice their religion.

Sukhothai nobles
Chairacha appointed his brother Prince Thianracha (later Maha Chakkrapat) as the Uparaja but did not grant him the title of King of Sukhothai as Chairacha was trying to unite the two kingdoms by reducing the power of Sukhothai nobles. He also called the Sukhothai nobles to Ayutthaya to move them from their base at Pitsanulok and made Ayutthaya the sole center of authority.

Mysterious death
Though not having a son by a queen, Chai did have one, Yodfa, from Lady Sudachan, his favorite Chao Chom.  However, she had a secret lover, Worawongsathirat, an officer of the Guards.  Returning from the north, Chai became ill and died, and suspicion fell on Lady Sudachan.  Her eleven-year-old son, Yodfa, became king in 1546. Chai's half brother, Prince Thianracha, became regent but entered a monastery to escape the ensuing power struggle. Sudachan became pregnant by Worawongsathirat and Yodfa was soon murdered.  Khun Worawongsa assumed power. Khun Piren, and other retired officers, then ambushed the king and queen, and placed Thianracha on the throne in 1549.

Ancestry

References

1546 deaths
Suphannaphum dynasty
Kings of Ayutthaya
Year of birth unknown
16th-century monarchs in Asia
Princes of Ayutthaya
16th-century Thai people